Jean Sothern (December 5, 1893 – April 14, 1964) was an American actress in silent films, vaudeville, and radio. She had leading roles in silent films and became popular before World War I.

Life and career

Sothern was born on December 5, 1893, in Philadelphia, Pennsylvania.

Sothern starred alongside Theda Bara in the 1915 silent film, The Two Orphans, as one of the title characters. It was followed by her well known portrayal of the character of Myra on the film serial The Mysteries of Myra.

In 1930, Sothern auditioned with Columbia Broadcasting to perform with their dramatic radio department. On radio, Sothern was heard regularly on Majestic Theater of the Air and played Katie on Robinson Crusoe, Jr.

Sothern died from esophageal cancer in Lancaster, Pennsylvania on April 14, 1964.

Filmography
Dr. Rameau (1915)
The Two Orphans (1915), as Louise
Should a Mother Tell? (1915), as Pamela Baudin
The Mysteries of Myra (1916), a serial, as Myra Maynard
Miss Deception (1917)
A Mother's Ordeal (1917)
Peg o' the Sea (1918), as Peg

Notes

References

External links
 
 

American silent film actresses
1893 births
1964 deaths
Vaudeville performers
American radio actresses
People from Lancaster, Pennsylvania
Deaths from esophageal cancer
Deaths from cancer in Pennsylvania
Actresses from Philadelphia
20th-century American actresses